Utkirbek Haydarov (Уткирбек Хайдаров; born January 25, 1974, in Andijon) is an Uzbekistani boxer who competed in the light heavyweight (81 kg) at the 2004 Summer Olympics and won the bronze medal.

Career
The aggressive southpaw won the middleweight world title six years earlier in Houston but lost his first match at the Olympics 2000 and moved up in weight.

He qualified for the 2004 Athens Games by ending up in first place in the 2nd AIBA Asian 2004 Olympic Qualifying Tournament in Karachi, Pakistan. In the final he defeated Turkmenistan's Shokhrat Kurbanov. At light heavyweight he also won the bronze medal at the 2005 World Amateur Boxing Championships in Mianyang, People's Republic of China after having

Olympic results 
2000 (as a middleweight)
Lost to Gaydarbek Gaydarbekov (Russia) 10–11

2004 (as a Light heavyweight)
Defeated Isaac Ekpo (Nigeria) 21–11
Defeated Abdelhani Kensi (Algeria) 31–19
Defeated Ihsan Yildirim Tarhan (Turkey) 16–11
Lost to Andre Ward (United States) 15–17

External links
 

1974 births
Living people
Uzbekistani male boxers
Olympic boxers of Uzbekistan
Olympic bronze medalists for Uzbekistan
Olympic medalists in boxing
Boxers at the 2000 Summer Olympics
Boxers at the 2004 Summer Olympics
Medalists at the 2002 Asian Games
Medalists at the 2004 Summer Olympics
Asian Games medalists in boxing
Asian Games gold medalists for Uzbekistan
Boxers at the 2002 Asian Games
Boxers at the 2006 Asian Games
AIBA World Boxing Championships medalists
People from Andijan
Middleweight boxers